The Houseguest and My Mother is a 1961 South Korean film directed by Shin Sang-ok. It is based on a best-selling novel by Chu Yo-Sup, it was given the Best Film award at the 1962 Asia Pacific Film Festival.The film was also selected as the South Korean entry for the Best Foreign Language Film at the 35th Academy Awards, but was not accepted as a nominee.

Not to be confused with the 2007 Korean film of the same name.

Plot
An artist from Seoul visits the widow of a deceased friend in the countryside. The relationship between the friend's wife, her mother and the artist is depicted with reference to their concerns about social disapproval.

Cast
 Choi Eun-hee
 Jeon Yeong-seon
 Kim Jin-kyu
 Han Eun-jin
 Do Kum-bong
 Jo Yeon-hee as Worker at a wedding shop

See also
List of submissions to the 35th Academy Awards for Best Foreign Language Film
List of South Korean submissions for the Academy Award for Best Foreign Language Film

References

Bibliography

External links

Films directed by Shin Sang-ok
1960s Korean-language films
South Korean drama films
1961 drama films